Konak is an underground station on the Fahrettin Altay—Evka 3 Line of the İzmir Metro in central Konak. Located just south of Konak Square, it is one of the ten original stations of the metro system. The architecture of the station consists of a main hall with a high ceiling, with mezzanines on both sides. The only other station to share this architecture is Çankaya. Connection to İzdeniz municipal ferries from Konak Terminal as well as ESHOT city bus service is available. Service began on 24 March 2018, connection to the Konak Tram also became possible via Konak İskele station. The northern mezzanine has exits to the Konak Ferry Terminal, Konak Square, while the southern mezzanine has exits to the Konak city bus stops, via an underpass beneath Halil Rıfat Paşa Avenue.

Konak station was opened on 22 May 2000.

Connections
ESHOT operates city bus service on İnönü Avenue.

Nearby Places of Interest
Konak Square
İzmir Clock Tower
Yalı Mosque
Kemeraltı
Hisar Mosque
İzmir Art and Sculpture Museum
Elhamra Theater
Konak Theater
İzmir Archaeological Museum

References

İzmir Metro
Railway stations opened in 2000
2000 establishments in Turkey
Railway stations in İzmir Province